King Taejo(dae) (claimed 47 – 165) was the sixth monarch of Goguryeo, the northernmost of the Three Kingdoms of Korea, from AD 53 to 146. Under his reign, the young state expanded its territory and developed into a centrally ruled kingdom. His 93-year reign is thought to be the third longest of any monarch in the world, although this is disputed.

Background 
Taejo's father was the youngest son of Goguryeo's second king, Yuri, Go Jaesa (재사, 再思), the head of the Go house of the Gyeru lineage, one of the five powerful houses of the royal court. His mother was from Buyeo (Queen Mother Buyeo).

Although the unpopular Mobon had named his son Ik as the crown prince, after Mobon's death in 53, the Goguryeo court nominated Jaesa to be the next king. Citing his advanced age, Jaesa declined and his seven-year-old son, Gung(taejo) became king. His mother then acted as regent for the young king.

Expansion and centralization
During the first year of his reign, he centralized the kingdom by turning the five clans into five provinces ruled by a governor from that clan, who were under the direct control of the king. He thereby firmly established royal control of the military, economy, and politics.

He conquered the states of Eastern Okjeo in 56, Galsa in 68, Jona in 72, and Juna in 74. He absorbed regional forces into the central bureaucracy, and traveled throughout his territories to strengthen royal control.

He fought on various occasions with China's Han Dynasty and disrupted trade between Lelang and Han. In 55, he ordered the construction of a fortress in the Liaodong Commandery. He attacked Chinese border regions in 105, 111, and 118. In 122, Taejo allied with the Mahan confederacy of central Korea and the neighboring Yemaek tribe to attack Liaodong, greatly expanding the realm of Goguryeo. He launched another major attack in 146.

Death 
In the 94th year of his reign, Taejo's younger brother Suseong took the throne to become King Chadae. Although not found in the more orthodox Samguk Sagi, the Samguk Yusa says that Chadae soon killed both of Taejo's sons, and that the subsequent king Sindae, younger half-brother to Taejo and Chadae, killed both of his brothers in 165.

According to Samguk Sagi and Samguk Yusa, Taejo died at the age of 118, after ruling for 93 years. This claim, if taken at face value, would make him the longest living and reigning king in Korean history, and also among the longest lived in world history.

According to the Chinese historical work Book of Later Han (in volume 85), Taejo died in the year 121, and his son Chadae stepped up.  After Emperor An of Han decided not to initiate another battle  with Goguryeo, Chadae settled peace with Han Dynasty in the following year.  The imperial edict for this event was recorded as well.  This date of death would involve a reign of 68 years—still one of the thirty longest reigning monarchs--and a lifespan of 74 years, in contrast to a nigh-supernatural 118-year longevity.

Controversy surrounding rise to power
Jumong, the founder of Goguryeo, declared his surname to be Go. However, his son Yuri chose to use the surname Hae (해; 解). The three successors of Jumong and Yuri all utilized the surname Hae as well, instead of Go. After the last of these Hae rulers, a boy with the surname Go rose to the throne after deposing the last Hae ruler and his appointed successor. From viewing these historical facts, some scholars have come to the conclusion that the difference in surname was not a coincidence, but a clear indication that Jumong's immediate successors were not his descendants. The Hae rulers indicate the brief rule of the Sono-clan and the rise of King Taejo may indicate that the Go rulers of the Gyeru-clan regained power.

Another point of great interest among select scholars is the bestowing of the posthumous title of Taejo, which means "Grand Ancestor," on the sixth ruler of Goguryeo and not the first. Scholars have therefore stated that this fact is further proof that different families ruled early Goguryeo before the consolidation of power under King Taejo. These are highly controversial at present times among historians and scholars.

See also
History of Korea
Three Kingdoms of Korea
List of Korean monarchs

References

 Yang, S.C.  The South and North Korean political systems:  A comparative analysis. (Rev. Ed.)  Seoul:  Hollym.  
 http://www.koreandb.net/Sam/bon/samkuk/04_1501.htm

47 births
165 deaths
Goguryeo rulers
Longevity claims
2nd-century monarchs in Asia
1st-century monarchs in Asia
1st-century Korean people
2nd-century Korean people
Muism